The Scream Awards is an award show dedicated to the horror, sci-fi, and fantasy genres of feature films, hosted and sponsored by Spike. The show was created by executive producers Michael Levitt, Cindy Levitt, and Casey Patterson. The performer on the show was M.I.A.

Billed simply as Scream 2010, the 2010 ceremony was held at the Greek Theatre in Los Angeles on October 16 and was broadcast on October 19, 2010.

Special awards
 Michael J. Fox and Christopher Lloyd reunited on stage to celebrate the 25th Anniversary of Back to the Future
 Heroine Award - Sigourney Weaver
 Farewell Tribute - Lost
 Comic-Con Icon Award - Ray Bradbury

World Premieres
 Paranormal Activity 2 presented by Katie Featherston and Micah Sloat
 Super presented by Rainn Wilson
 The Rite presented by Sir Anthony Hopkins
 The Walking Dead presented by Jon Bernthal, Sarah Wayne Callies and Robert Kirkman
 Scream 4 presented by David Arquette, Neve Campbell, Wes Craven and Emma Roberts
 Harry Potter and the Deathly Hallows – Part 1 (no presenter)
 Avatar presented by James Cameron

Performance
 "Teqkilla" performed by M.I.A.

Online write-in winners
 Most Anticipated Movie - Green Lantern
 Best Worst Movie - Piranha 3-D
 Best Independent Movie - Dread

Competitive Categories
Nominees and winners for each announced category are listed below. Winners are listed in boldface.

The Ultimate Scream
 Inception
 Alice in Wonderland
 Avatar
 District 9
 Iron Man 2
 Kick-Ass
 Lost
 True Blood
 The Twilight Saga: Eclipse
 Zombieland

Best Science Fiction Movie
 Inception
 Avatar
 District 9
 Iron Man 2
 Predators
 The Road

Best Fantasy Movie
 The Twilight Saga: Eclipse
 Alice in Wonderland
 The Imaginarium of Doctor Parnassus
 Kick-Ass
 Toy Story 3
 Where the Wild Things Are

Best Horror Movie
 Zombieland
 The Crazies
 A Nightmare on Elm Street
 Paranormal Activity
 Shutter Island
 Thirst

Best TV Show
 True Blood
 Dexter
 Doctor Who
 Lost
 V

Best Director
 James Cameron - Avatar
 Neill Blomkamp - District 9
 Tim Burton - Alice in Wonderland
 Roland Emmerich - 2012
 Christopher Nolan - Inception
 Martin Scorsese - Shutter Island

Best Scream-Play
 Shutter Island - Laeta Kalogridis
 District 9 - Neill Blomkamp and Terri Tatchell
 Inception - Christopher Nolan
 Kick-Ass - Matthew Vaughn and Jane Goldman
 Toy Story 3 - Michael Arndt
 Zombieland - Paul Wernick and Rhett Reese

Best Fantasy Actress
 Kristen Stewart - The Twilight Saga: Eclipse
 Cate Blanchett - Robin Hood
 Lily Cole - The Imaginarium of Doctor Parnassus
 Chloë Grace Moretz - Kick-Ass
 Saoirse Ronan - The Lovely Bones
 Mia Wasikowska - Alice in Wonderland

Best Fantasy Actor
 Robert Pattinson - The Twilight Saga: Eclipse
 Nicolas Cage - Kick-Ass
 Johnny Depp - Alice in Wonderland
 Tom Hanks - Toy Story 3
 Aaron Johnson - Kick-Ass
 Taylor Lautner - The Twilight Saga: Eclipse

Best Science Fiction Actress
 Scarlett Johansson - Iron Man 2
 Mila Kunis - The Book of Eli
 Evangeline Lilly - Lost
 Elliot Page - Inception
 Gwyneth Paltrow - Iron Man 2
 Zoe Saldana - Avatar

Best Science Fiction Actor
 Leonardo DiCaprio - Inception
 Sharlto Copley - District 9
 Robert Downey Jr. - Iron Man 2
 Matthew Fox - Lost
 Josh Holloway - Lost
 Denzel Washington - The Book of Eli

Best Horror Actress
 Anna Paquin - True Blood
 Julie Benz - Dexter
 Emily Blunt - The Wolfman
 Charlotte Gainsbourg - Antichrist
 Milla Jovovich - The Fourth Kind
 Emma Stone - Zombieland

Best Horror Actor
 Alexander Skarsgård - True Blood
 Leonardo DiCaprio - Shutter Island
 Michael C. Hall - Dexter
 Woody Harrelson - Zombieland
 Stephen Moyer - True Blood
 Timothy Olyphant - The Crazies

Best Villain
 Iron Man 2 - Mickey Rourke as Ivan Vanko
 A Nightmare on Elm Street - Jackie Earle Haley as Freddy Krueger
 Avatar - Stephen Lang as Col. Miles Quatrich
 The Human Centipede - Dieter Laser as Dr. Joseph Hieter
 Dexter - John Lithgow as The Trinity Killer
 Lost - Terry O'Quinn as John Locke/The Man in Black

Best Superhero
 Iron Man 2 - Robert Downey Jr. as Iron Man
 Kick-Ass - Nicolas Cage as Big Daddy
 Kick-Ass - Aaron Johnson as Kick-Ass
 Kick-Ass - Chloë Grace Moretz as Hit-Girl
 Heroes - Zachary Quinto as Sylar
 Smallville - Tom Welling as Clark Kent

Best Supporting Actor
 Joseph Gordon-Levitt - Inception
 Don Cheadle - Iron Man 2
 Ben Kingsley - Shutter Island
 Christopher Mintz-Plasse - Kick-Ass
 Mark Ruffalo - Shutter Island
 Sam Trammell - True Blood

Best Supporting Actress
 Anne Hathaway - Alice in Wonderland
 Abigail Breslin - Zombieland
 Jennifer Carpenter - Dexter
 Marion Cotillard - Inception
 Yunjin Kim - Lost
 Sigourney Weaver - Avatar

Best Breakout Performance - Female
 Chloë Grace Moretz - Kick-Ass
 Gemma Arterton - Prince of Persia: The Sands of Time
 Morena Baccarin - V
 Lyndsy Fonseca - Kick-Ass
 Mia Wasikowska - Alice in Wonderland
 Deborah Ann Woll - True Blood

Best Breakout Performance - Male
 Tom Hardy - Inception
 Sharlto Copley - District 9
 Andrew Garfield - The Imaginarium of Doctor Parnassus
 Aaron Johnson - Kick-Ass
 Xavier Samuel - The Twilight Saga: Eclipse
 Kodi Smit-McPhee - The Road

Best Cameo
 Bill Murray - Zombieland
 Bubo The Mechanical Owl - Clash of the Titans
 Michael Caine - Inception
 Rosario Dawson - Percy Jackson & the Olympians: The Lightning Thief
 Stan Lee - Iron Man 2

Best Ensemble
 Zombieland
 Inception
 Iron Man 2
 Kick-Ass
 Lost
 True Blood

Fight Scene of the Year
 Inception - "Anti-Gravity Hotel Fight"
 The Losers - "Aisha vs Clay"
 Kick-Ass - "Hit-Girl vs The Drug Dealers"
 Iron Man 2 - "Final Battle: Iron Man and War Machine vs Whiplash and the Drones"
 Avatar - "Final Battle: Na'vi vs Military"
 Clash of the Titans - "Perseus and the Heroes vs Medusa"

Holy Sh*t Scene of the Year
 True Blood - "Head twisted 180 degrees during sex" Kick-Ass - "Damon McCready shoots little daughter Mindy in chest"
 2012 - "The Destruction of Los Angeles"
 Splice - "Dren mates with Clive"
 Inception - "Freight train drives through city street"
 Inception - "Paris street folds over onto itself"

Most Memorable Mutilation
 The Human Centipede, The Human Centipede (First Sequence)
 The Pound of Flesh Trap, Saw VI
 Scalped, Inglourious Basterds
 Heart Souffle, True Blood
 The Needle Trap, Saw VI

3-D Top Three
 Avatar
 Alice in Wonderland
 Toy Story 3

Best F/X
 Avatar
 2012
 District 9
 Inception
 Iron Man 2
 Zombieland

Best Television Performance
 Matthew Fox - Lost
 Michael C. Hall - Dexter
 Zachary Quinto - Heroes
 Alexander Skarsgård - True Blood
 Anna Torv - Fringe

Best Comic Book or Graphic Novel
 The Walking Dead
 Asterios Polyp
 Blackest Night
 The Boys
 Chew
 Parker: The Hunter
 Scalped

Best Comic Book Writer
 Geoff Johns
 Jason Aaron
 Darwyn Cooke
 Garth Ennis
 Robert Kirkman
 Mike Mignola

Best Comic Book Artist
 Frank Quitely - Batman and Robin: Batman
 Charlie Adlard - The Walking Dead
 Darwyn Cooke - Parker: The Hunter
 Fábio Moon - BPRD: 1947, Sugarshock
 Jill Thompson - Beasts of Burden
 J.H. Williams III - Detective Comics: Batwoman: Elegy

Best Comic Book Movie

 Kick-Ass
 Iron Man 2
 The Losers

See also
 Saturn Award

References

Scream Awards